Penelope Dale Milford (born March 23, 1948) is an American stage and screen actress. She is best known for her role as Vi Munson in Coming Home (1978) for which she was nominated for the Academy Award for Best Supporting Actress. She also originated the role of Jenny Anderson in the Broadway musical Shenandoah, for which she was nominated for a Drama Desk Award in 1975.

Early life and education
Milford was born March 23, 1948 in St. Louis, Missouri and grew up in Illinois. She is the daughter of Richard George Milford and Ann Marie ( Felt) Milford. She graduated from New Trier High School in Winnetka, Illinois. Her younger brother, Kim, was an actor and musician until his death from heart failure at age 37.

Career

Theatre
In 1972, she joined the Broadway cast of the play Lenny, about the life of actor Lenny Bruce. In 1974, she was cast as Jenny Anderson in the musical Shenandoah, based on the 1965 film of the same name. Shenandoah opened on Broadway on January 7, 1975 and was nominated for the Tony Award for Best Musical. For her performance, Milford was nominated for the first Drama Desk Award for Best Featured Actress.

Off-Broadway in 1971, Milford starred as Judith opposite Richard Gere in Long Time Coming and a Long Time Gone, a musical about artist Richard Fariña. Milford has appeared in Felix (1974), Fishing (1981) by Michael Weller, and Territorial Rites (1983). She also performed in a revue show titled The Second Hottest Show in Town.

In 2013, Milford played the role of Deborah in the Harold Pinter play A Kind of Alaska at the Cocoon Theatre in Rhinebeck, New York.

Television
Her first television appearance was on a 1976 episode of The Blue Knight. In 1980, Milford starred in Seizure: The Story of Kathy Morris, as Kathy Morris. Also in 1980 she co-starred in the Emmy Award winning television movie The Oldest Living Graduate starring Henry Fonda and Cloris Leachman. In 1982 she starred opposite Sondra Locke in the Jackie Cooper directed Emmy Award winning television film Rosie: The Rosemary Clooney Story. In this film she played Betty Clooney, the sister of Rosemary Clooney. In 1984, Penelope appeared in the Golden Globe award-winning television movie The Burning Bed starring Farrah Fawcett. In 1985 she guest starred on an episode of The Hitchhiker.

Film
Milford's first film appearance was as an extra on the Norman Mailer film Maidstone (1970). In 1974, she appeared in the movie Man on a Swing. She next played a fictional actress named Lorna Sinclair in Ken Russell's BAFTA-nominated 1977 film Valentino, about the life of actor Rudolph Valentino. In 1978, she was cast as Vi Munson in Coming Home, and she was nominated for an Academy Award, for Best Supporting Actress. In 1980, she appeared in the movie The Last Word. She plays a supporting role in Take This Job and Shove It and Endless Love. In 1982, she starred in the horror film Blood Link and then starred in the 1983 adventure film The Golden Seal.

After this time, her film appearances became less frequent, not appearing until the 1988 cult film Heathers. Her last few films include Cold Justice (1989), Miss Missouri (1990), Normal Life (1996), Henry: Portrait of a Serial Killer, Part II (1996) and Night of the Lawyers (1997).

Filmography
 1970 Maidstone (uncredited)
 1974 Man on a Swing as Evelyn Moore
 1976 The Blue Knight (1 episode)
 1977 Valentino as Lorna Sinclair
 1978 Coming Home as Vi Munson
 1979 The Last Word as Denise Travis
 1980 Seizure: The Story of Kathy Morris (TV) as Kathy Morris
 1980 The Oldest Living Graduate (TV) as Martha Ann
 1981 Take This Job and Shove It as Lenore Meade
 1981 Endless Love as Ingrid Orchester
 1982 Rosie: The Rosemary Clooney Story (TV) as Betty Clooney
 1982 Blood Link as Julie Warren
 1983 The Golden Seal as Tania Lee
 1984 The Burning Bed (TV) as Gaby
 1985 The Hitchhiker as Diane Hampton (1 episode)
 1988 Heathers as Pauline Fleming
 1989 Cold Justice as Eileen
 1990 Miss Missouri as Ann
 1996 Normal Life as Adele Anderson
 1996 Henry: Portrait of a Serial Killer, Part II as Woman In Woods, Henry's First Victim
 1997 Night of the Lawyers as Anna Carroll

References

External links
 
 
 

1948 births
Living people
American film actresses
American stage actresses
American television actresses
Actresses from St. Louis
New Trier High School alumni
People from Saugerties, New York
20th-century American actresses
21st-century American actresses